Universiade station is an interchange station for Line 3, Line 14 and Line 16 of the Shenzhen Metro between Jihe Highway and Huangge South Road. Line 3 platforms opened on 28 December 2010 , Line 14 platforms opened on 28 October 2022 and Line 16 platforms opened on 28 December 2022.

Station layout

Exits

Gallery

References

External links

 Shenzhen Metro Universiade Station (Chinese)
 Shenzhen Metro Universiade Station (English)

Railway stations in Guangdong
Shenzhen Metro stations
Longgang District, Shenzhen
Railway stations in China opened in 2010